Xochitl Liana Torres Small (first name pronounced  ; born November 15, 1984) is an American attorney and politician serving as the Under Secretary of Agriculture for Rural Development at the United States Department of Agriculture since 2021. In February 2023, President Joe Biden nominated her to serve as the United States deputy secretary of agriculture.

Early life and education
Xochitl Liana Torres was born on November 15, 1984, in Portland, Oregon, to Marcos and Cynthia "Cynta" Torres. Her parents were educators. Torres Small was raised in Las Cruces, New Mexico.

Torres graduated from Mayfield High School in absentia while she earned her International Baccalaureate (IB) Diploma from Waterford Kamhlaba United World College in Mbabane, Swaziland. She earned a Bachelor of Science in Foreign Service degree from Georgetown University and her Juris Doctor degree from the University of New Mexico School of Law.

Early career 
Torres Small worked as a field representative for U.S. Senator Tom Udall from 2009 to 2012. She served as a federal law clerk in the New Mexico District from 2015 to 2016. She worked as a water attorney with the Kemp Smith law firm.

U.S. House of Representatives

2018 election

The Republican incumbent, Steve Pearce, declined to run for reelection in order to run for governor of New Mexico. Torres Small defeated Madeline Hildebrandt in the Democratic Party primary election and Republican state Representative Yvette Herrell in the general election. She ran as a moderate Democrat.

The results were close on election night, with Herrell in the lead at the end of the night; some New Mexico media organizations projected that she would win. The next day, more ballots were counted, narrowing Herrell's lead, and media organizations rescinded their projections. On November 7, after all absentee ballots were counted, the New Mexico Secretary of State declared Torres Small the winner.

Tenure
In her first week in office, Torres Small and other members of the Congressional Hispanic Caucus (CHC) traveled to the United States Border Patrol station at Alamogordo, New Mexico, where Felipe Gómez Alonzo, an eight-year-old Guatemalan immigrant, died in custody.

In the 2020 presidential election, Torres Small said she would vote for Joe Biden despite disagreeing with some of his energy policy stances.

GovTrack reports that during her two years in Congress, Torres Small was the primary sponsor of three bills that became law, got her bills out of committee the tenth-most often of House freshmen and missed approximately 0.4% of House votes.

Committee assignments 
 Committee on Armed Services
 Subcommittee on Readiness
 Subcommittee on Tactical Air and Land Forces
 Committee on Homeland Security
 Subcommittee on Border Security, Facilitation and Operations
 Subcommittee on Oversight, Management and Accountability (Chair)
Committee on Agriculture
Subcommittee on Biotechnology, Horticulture, and Research
Subcommittee on General Farm Commodities and Risk Management

Caucus memberships 
 Blue Dog Coalition
 Congressional Caucus for Women's Issues
 Congressional Hispanic Caucus
 New Democrat Coalition

2020 election

Herrell ran again in 2020. During a debate in the campaign, she claimed to be "unashamedly pro-God, pro-life, pro-gun, pro-business and pro-family", while Torres Small touted her votes on oil and gas that bucked the Democratic Party's positions. OpenSecrets reports that Torres Small outspent Herrell by over $5 million.

Republicans targeted the seat as a pickup opportunity. Despite polling showing a dead heat, Herrell won by over 7%.

U.S. Department of Agriculture 
On June 18, 2021, it was announced that President Joe Biden would nominate Torres Small as Under Secretary for Rural Development at the United States Department of Agriculture. She was confirmed by voice vote on October 7, 2021.

On February 15, 2023, President Biden announced his intent to nominate Torres Small for United States deputy secretary of agriculture.

Electoral history

Personal life 
In 2016, Torres Small's husband, Nathan Small, was elected to the New Mexico House of Representatives, representing the 36th district. He ran for reelection in 2018, winning with 59.9% of the vote. She is a Lutheran.

See also
Women in the United States House of Representatives

References

External links

|-

|-

1984 births
21st-century American politicians
21st-century American women politicians
American Lutherans
Biden administration personnel
Christians from New Mexico
Christians from Oregon
Democratic Party members of the United States House of Representatives from New Mexico
Female members of the United States House of Representatives
Walsh School of Foreign Service alumni
Hispanic and Latino American members of the United States Congress
Living people
Lutherans from New Mexico
New Mexico lawyers
Politicians from Las Cruces, New Mexico
Politicians from Portland, Oregon
Protestants from New Mexico
United States Under Secretaries of Agriculture
People educated at a United World College
University of New Mexico School of Law alumni
Waterford Kamhlaba alumni
Women in New Mexico politics